Dolna Banjica is a village in the municipality of Gostivar, North Macedonia. Its FIPS code was MK27.

History
A policy of Turkification of the Albanian population was employed by the Yugoslav authorities in cooperation with the Turkish government, stretching the period of 1948-1959. Starting in 1948, Turkish schools were opened in areas with large Albanian majorities, such as  Gorna Banjica and Dolna Banjica.

Demographics
As of the 2021 census, Dolna Banjica had 3,138 residents with the following ethnic composition:
Turks 1,254
Albanians 1,166
Macedonians 391
Persons for whom data are taken from administrative sources 307
Roma 14
Others 6

According to the 2002 census, the village had a total of 4,356 inhabitants. Ethnic groups in the village include:

Albanians 2,444
Turks 1,524
Macedonians 355
Romani 9
Serbs 1 
Bosniaks 1
Others 23

Sports
The local football club FC Genç Kalemler has played in the Macedonian Second Football League.

References

External links

Villages in Gostivar Municipality
Albanian communities in North Macedonia
Turkish communities in North Macedonia